HD 136118 is a star in the Serpens Caput section of the Serpens constellation. The star is too dim to be readily visible to the naked eye, having an apparent visual magnitude of 6.93. It is located at a distance of 165 light years from the Sun based on parallax, and is drifting closer with a radial velocity of −3 km/s.

This object is an F-type main-sequence star with a stellar classification of F7V.
The absolute visual magnitude of this star suggests that it has begun to evolve away from the main sequence. The abundances of the stellar atmosphere are similar to the Sun, and it has only a modest level of chromospheric activity. HD 136118 has 84% more mass compared to the Sun, and is 70% larger in radius. The star is an estimated 3.5 billion years old and is spinning with a projected rotational velocity of 8.5 km/s.

Brown dwarf companion 

The astronomer Debra Fischer discovered a substellar companion, originally thought to be a very massive exoplanet, which was announced on February 7, 2002. On November 25, 2009, its inclination was calculated to be 163.1° and its true mass , classifying it as a brown dwarf.

Due to its high mass the object is likely to be very hot and possibly glowing faintly. The orbit of the object has a semimajor axis of 1.45 astronomical units from the parent star, taking  to complete one eccentric orbit.

See also 
 List of brown dwarfs

References

External links 
 

F-type main-sequence stars
Brown dwarfs
Serpens (constellation)
Durchmusterung objects
136118
074948